One Bar Left is the EP from American rapper Illogic. It was released free in 2008. The EP was entirely produced by Ill Poetic.

Track list

References

External links
 Official website

2008 EPs
Illogic albums
Alternative hip hop EPs